Jackson William Yueill (born March 19, 1997) is an American professional soccer player who plays as a midfielder for Major League Soccer club San Jose Earthquakes and the United States national team.

Early life 
Jackson Yueill grew up in Bloomington, Minnesota where he played youth soccer for Ramalynn Academy as well as Bloomington Jefferson, where he helped lead the Jaguars to the State Soccer Tournament as a freshman.

College 
Yueill played two years of college soccer at UCLA between 2015 and 2016, where he was named NSCAA First Team All-Far West Region and First Team All-Pac-12 Conference both years.

Yueill left college after the 2016 to sign a Generation Adidas contract with Major League Soccer.

Club career
On January 13, 2017, Yueill was selected 6th overall in the 2017 MLS SuperDraft by San Jose Earthquakes. Yueill made his professional debut on March 25, 2017, while on loan to San Jose's United Soccer League affiliate Reno 1868, starting in a 2–0 loss to Orange County SC. He scored his first professional goal in the fourth round of the 2017 U.S. Open Cup in a 2–0 victory over the San Francisco Deltas at Avaya Stadium.

This performance was followed by Yueill's Major League Soccer debut as a 75th minute substitute in a scoreless home draw against Sporting Kansas City on June 17, 2017. His first MLS start came at Stanford Stadium on July 1 in a 2–1 victory over the LA Galaxy. Yueill was one of two Earthquakes players, the other being Nick Lima, nominated on October 14, 2017, for the MLS Rookie of the Year Award.

International career
Yueill received his first call up for the United States U-23 national team in March 2019, featuring in matches against Egypt and the Netherlands. Yueill received his first ever call up to the senior United States squad on June 1, 2019. He was the only player selected that was not on the team's provisional 2019 Gold Cup roster. He made his senior debut on June 5, 2019 in a friendly against Jamaica.

Career statistics

Club

International 

Source: US Soccer

Honors
United States
CONCACAF Gold Cup: 2021
CONCACAF Nations League: 2019–20

References

External links

Bruins bio

1997 births
Living people
American soccer players
UCLA Bruins men's soccer players
San Jose Earthquakes players
Reno 1868 FC players
Association football midfielders
Soccer players from Minnesota
San Jose Earthquakes draft picks
Sportspeople from Bloomington, Minnesota
Major League Soccer players
USL Championship players
United States men's youth international soccer players
United States men's under-20 international soccer players
United States men's international soccer players
United States men's under-23 international soccer players
2021 CONCACAF Gold Cup players
CONCACAF Gold Cup-winning players